Lt. Philip Dalton (April 1, 1903 – July 25, 1941) was a United States military scientist, pilot and engineer.  Dalton is best known for his invention of several slide-rule analog flight computers, the most famous being the E6B.

Early life and education
Dalton was born in Scotia, New York to William and Ida Dalton, and studied engineering at Cornell University's College of Engineering where he joined the ROTC.  Upon graduation he received a commission as a Lieutenant of Field Artillery in the United States Army Reserve . He continued his studies at Princeton University, where he received a Masters in Physics and Harvard after which he resigned his Army commission and joined the United States Naval Reserve.   He received his wings at NAS Pensacola, and flew scout planes on the cruiser Northampton.

Invention
While serving as US Naval Reserve Pilot, Dalton took an interest in slide-rule flight computers.  His first models were designed in the early 1930s but it was not until 1932 that the first revision of the E-6B, originally known as the "Dalton Dead Reckoning Computer", came into existence.

Death
On October 30, 1940, Dalton was recalled to active duty and assigned to Naval Air Station Anacostia, across the river from Washington, DC to help train naval aviators. On July 24, 1941, Dalton and Harry Lee Rogers, Jr., a student pilot, were killed when their aircraft crashed near Hybla Valley, Virginia. By this time, Dalton's devices were in widespread use by all aviation branches of the US and British military services.

References

1903 births
1941 deaths
20th-century American naval officers
American aerospace engineers
Aviators killed in aviation accidents or incidents in the United States
Cornell University College of Engineering alumni
Engineers from New York (state)
American navigators
Princeton University alumni
People from Schenectady County, New York
United States Army reservists
United States Naval Aviators
20th-century American engineers
Victims of aviation accidents or incidents in 1941
United States Army officers
United States Navy reservists